This is a list of European women's national football team managers. This encompasses every manager who currently manages a women's national team under the control of UEFA.

Managers
Last update: 11 September 2022. Default sorting is descending by time as manager.

References

Europe
Europe
Women's association football in Europe